The 2006 Campionati Internazionali di Sicilia was a men's tennis tournaments played on outdoor clay courts in Palermo, Italy that was part of the International Series of the 2006 ATP Tour. It was the 28th edition of the tournament and was held from 25 September through 1 October 2006. Second-seeded Filippo Volandri won the singles title.

Finals

Singles

 Filippo Volandri defeated  Nicolás Lapentti 5–7, 6–1, 6–3
 It was Volandri's 1st title of the year and the 2nd of his career.

Doubles

 Martín García /  Luis Horna defeated  Mariusz Fyrstenberg /  Marcin Matkowski 7–6(7–1), 7–6(7–2)
 It was García's 1st title of the year and the 6th of his career. It was Horna's 1st title of the year and the 2nd of his career.

References

External links
 ITF tournament edition details

Campionati Internazionali di Sicilia
Campionati Internazionali di Sicilia
Campionati Internazionali di Sicilia